Between Heaven and Hell is a 1956 American Cinemascope war film based on the novel The Day the Century Ended by Francis Gwaltney that the film follows closely. The story is told in flashback format detailing the life of Sam Gifford (Robert Wagner) from his life as a Southern landowner to his war service in the Philippines during World War II.

The film stars Robert Wagner, Terry Moore, and Broderick Crawford, and was directed by Richard Fleischer. It was partly filmed on Kaua'i. The film's score by Hugo Friedhofer, which included elements of the Dies Irae, was nominated for an Oscar for Best Scoring of a Dramatic or Comedy Picture.

Plot
In 1945, on a Pacific island, Sergeant Sam Gifford (Wagner) is demoted to the rank of private after striking an officer. He is transferred to a punishment company, run by the dictatorial Captain Grimes, who insists on being called "Waco" in order to prevent his own death by Japanese snipers. Through flashback, we learn Gifford's backstory—his civilian status as a wealthy cotton farmer, married to the beautiful daughter of his National Guard commander, who is also a well-to-do plantation owner. After their reserve unit is sent to the Pacific theater, Gifford becomes close buddies with several of his own sharecroppers—people he had never socialized with at home. As a sergeant, Gifford capably leads his platoon, earning himself a medal for valor. Occasionally, however, Gifford outwardly exhibits signs of fear, battle fatigue, and neurosis. These weaknesses intensify when his father-in-law is killed by a sniper. Another officer, disdainful of his men both as workers and as soldiers, machine guns Gifford's friends out of cowardice and panic. Gifford attempts to beat him to death with the butt of his rifle. The flashback ends when Waco calls Gifford into company headquarters.

Waco orders Gifford to lead a six-man patrol to check a town believed to be the location of a Japanese headquarters. The patrol finds the town abandoned, but the patrol spots a platoon-strength unit of the Japanese Imperial Army, equipped with mortars, heading towards the hills near Waco's headquarters. On returning, as Gifford reports his findings to Waco, a heavy barrage from Japanese mortars commences. Afterwards, Gifford is sent by Waco to outpost duty with a lieutenant nicknamed Little Joe (Brad Dexter). There he forms a friendship with another former sharecropper, Willie Crawford (Buddy Ebsen). After an attack, the outpost loses radio contact with the company and Gifford is sent back to company HQ for fresh batteries. He arrives to find that Waco has been relieved of command when several wounded men informed battalion headquarters of his behavior. Waco, in formal uniform including rank insignia as he prepares to leave, is shot and killed by a Japanese sniper when he demands that his soldiers salute him.

Gifford returns to the outpost, which is hit with another attack in which Little Joe is killed. Gifford and Crawford are the sole survivors. With Crawford wounded in the leg, Crawford orders Gifford back to warn the Company of an impending massive Japanese buildup. At first Gifford refuses to leave the injured Crawford behind, but Crawford insists, pointing a pistol at Gifford. Gifford fights his way through Japanese lines but is wounded along the way. Upon reaching the company he finds that most of the Battalion has launched a new offensive. Gifford warns them about the Japanese units massing in the hills. He demands that help be sent to rescue Crawford. Just at that moment a patrol arrives with Crawford on a stretcher. Crawford and Gifford are told because of their wounds they are being shipped home. Gifford tells Crawford that he wants Crawford to live with him and his family at his mansion back home and he can have a job at Gifford's company.

Cast
 Robert Wagner as Private Sam Gifford
 Terry Moore as Jenny Gifford
 Broderick Crawford as Captain "Waco" Grimes
 Buddy Ebsen as Corporal Willie Crawford
 Robert Keith as Colonel Cousins
 Brad Dexter as Lieutenant Joe 'Little Joe' Johnson
 Mark Damon as Private Terry
 Ken Clark as Morgan
 Harvey Lembeck as Private Bernie Meleski
 Skip Homeier as Corporal Swanson
 L. Q. Jones as Private Kenny
 Tod Andrews as Lieutenant Ray Mosby
 Biff Elliot as Lieutenant Tom Thumb
 Bart Burns as Private Raker
 Frank Gorshin as Private Millard (uncredited)
 Scatman Crothers as George (uncredited)
 Sam Edwards as Soames (uncredited)
 Carl Switzer as Savage (uncredited)

Production
Arkansas-born Francis Irby Gwaltney soldiered in the Philippines with the 112th Cavalry that served throughout the Pacific doing several amphibious landings.  During this service he met and formed a friendship with Norman Mailer.

The Day the Century Ended was Gwaltney's most famous novel. When Fox picked the 1955 novel up for filming, they assigned it to Philippines veteran Rod Serling, famed for his American television plays. Unfortunately, Serling's first screenplay was nine hours long, and the project was given to other writers, notably Harry Brown, who had written the book A Walk in the Sun.

Between Heaven and Hell is one of the 1950s depictions of the US Army that did not paint a recruiting poster image and was more in tune with many soldiers' memories, such as From Here to Eternity,  Robert Aldrich's Attack or Samuel Fuller's films.

Fleischer uses the Cinemascope widescreen format well, notably in views of hills lit up by a firefight.

Reception

Critical response
When the film was first released, The New York Times panned the film, writing, "To be just as blunt about it as Twentieth Century-Fox, Between Heaven and Hell, a World War II drama, lands accordingly, with a pretty dull thud. This curiously rambling, unconvincing and often baffling picture, opening yesterday at Loew's State, very sketchily suggests the regeneration of a hard-headed young G. I. on a Japanese island in the Pacific...Except for the sideline skirmishes with the Japanese, and one fine, big beachhead battle staged by director Richard Fleischer, the action focuses on the outpost, where a brutal, slightly demented company commander, Mr. Crawford, reigns supreme. Mr. Wagner not only manages to survive some snarling comrades, most of whom are wiped out, but also the enemy in a series of lagging, disjointed clashes, verbal and physical, that shed little light on anything or anybody."

See also
List of American films of 1956

References

External links
 
 
 
 
 

1956 films
20th Century Fox films
1950s English-language films
Films directed by Richard Fleischer
Films shot in Hawaii
Films based on American novels
Films based on military novels
Japanese occupation of the Philippines films
Pacific War films
American war drama films
Films set in the Philippines
Films with screenplays by Harry Brown (writer)
Films scored by Hugo Friedhofer
CinemaScope films
1950s American films